Tapestry, Inc. is an American multinational luxury fashion holding company. It is based in New York City and is the parent company of three major brands: Coach New York, Kate Spade New York and Stuart Weitzman. Originally named Coach, Inc., the business changed its name to Tapestry on October 31, 2017.

History

Coach New York 
Coach was founded in 1941. Starting as a workshop, it grew into a company with over 17,000 employees. Seeking wider recognition and a larger market, the company acquired brands such as Kate Spade and Stuart Weitzman. This broadened the appeal to consumers of all three brands. The company changed names, reducing the share price because investors felt that the name change was not well received by customers. The share price later recovered.

Kate Spade New York 
American fashion designer Kate Spade founded Kate Spade New York in 1993. It was initially similar to the Coach company. The company was purchased by Coach in 2017 in a $2.4 billion deal.

Stuart Weitzman 
Stuart Weitzman started out in the late 1950s as a luxury shoe company named after one of the brothers who started it. It grew into a large operation in Manhattan. The brand was purchased by Coach in 2015 for $574 million. It was made to broaden Coach's product line

Tapestry, Inc. 
This business originally named Coach changed its name to Tapestry to become better match the fashion industry and  its customers. The company officially changed its name and ticker symbol on the New York Stock Exchange from COH to TPR on October 31, 2017. The company wanted to include more than just Coach-brand handbags, the company switched its name to represent a wider range of products. Most of these products are accessories, such as handbags, key-chains, shoes and other small fashion items. Most of these items are leather-goods and are produced by the individual subsidiaries.

In late July, 2020, the company named Joanne Crevoiserat, Tapestry's CFO since early 2019, the new CEO. She became the 36th female to lead a Fortune 500 company.

Leadership 

 Victor Luis began working with the company as the CEO of the Japanese subsidiary. He then worked in China. He rose to serve as Tapestry's International CEO, and then CEO of Tapestry, Inc.  
 In September 2019, Tapestry Inc. replaced Luis as CEO, announcing he would leave immediately and be succeeded by board Chairman Jide Zeitlin. Mr. Zeitlin is a former Goldman Sachs executive who has been on the board since 2006.
 Chief executive officer: Jide J. Zeitlin, former Goldman Sachs executive and chairman of the board, was appointed chief executive officer (CEO) of Tapestry in September 2019. In this role, Jide was responsible for the execution of the company's strategic agenda and financial performance. Mr. Zeitlin was elected to Tapestry's board of directors in June 2006 and served as the chairman of the board from November 2014 until his resignation in July 2020 after accusations of personal misconduct.
Tapestry announced in April 2021 that VF Corp. executive Scott Roe would be succeeding Andrea Shaw Resnick as CFO. He will receive an annual base salary of $925,000 and an annual bonus with a target of 125% of his base pay.

Controversy
In July 2020, Tapestry CEO Jide Zeitlin resigned from his positions as CEO and chairman amidst an investigation into his personal behavior. Previously, a woman had accused him of luring her into a romantic relationship in 2007 by pretending to be a photographer.

References

External links
 

Clothing companies based in New York City
Clothing companies established in 2017
Companies listed on the New York Stock Exchange